The basic law on copyright in Bolivia is Law No.1322 of April 13, 1992 on Copyright. Related and subsequent amending legislation are listed at the relevant WIPO page. Bolivia has signed the Berne Convention.

References

External links
Law No.1322 of April 13, 1992 on Copyright Full text of the law in English.
Law No.1322 of April 13, 1992 on Copyright Full text of the law in Spanish.

Law of Bolivia
Bolivia